Fylde Memorial Arboretum and Community Woodland is a site of remembrance at Bispham, Blackpool, Lancashire, England. It is the only one of its kind outside the National Memorial Arboretum, Alrewas, Staffordshire.

Its stated aim is to

Origins
The idea for the arboretum and community woodland was conceived by Don Aiken, the Vice-President of the Fylde Ex-Service Liaison Committee in the summer of 2008. Investigating the possibility of planting a memorial tree to commemorate comrades of the D-Day and Normandy Veterans, an article in the Blackpool Gazette from the Forestry Commission offered to fund the planting of woodland areas. After he contacted them they agreed to fund the arboretum, and subsequently, Blackpool Council agreed to provide the land.

History
The arboretum was unveiled on 23 February 2009 following a £14,000 grant from the Forestry Commission English Woodland Grant Scheme and funds from First TransPennine Express. Blackpool Council's Parks Service designed the plans for the memorial woodland, while rangers worked with local school children and community groups to plant trees.

Officially opened on 26 June 2009 with a service of dedication, the arboretum has a main memorial plaque as well as 16 smaller plinths. It is run by the Arboretum Committee, an offshoot of the Fylde Ex-Service Liaison Committee, with the aim of providing the service associations, and the people of Blackpool and the Fylde, with "a place of peace and beauty in which to remember their fallen comrades and loved ones". The woodland has 2,500 trees, from the Forestry Commission, all planted and available for dedication.

In August 2009, the arboretum and woodland, which covers two hectares, received a grant of £35,000 from the Forestry Commission for the purchase of trees and the construction of paths.

Location
Located in fields next to Moor Park School, Moor Park Avenue, in the Bispham area of Blackpool, on a site covering two hectares, it contains a multitude of young trees of diverse size and species with the intention of these trees developing over time into a well kept woodland.

Services Glade
At the centre of the Memorial Arboretum's "Services Glade" area is a simple monument topped by a large inscribed slab of polished black granite. A large flag pole stands permanently flying the Union Flag.

This is surrounded by a circle of 16 young oak trees, which were dedicated by member associations of the Fylde Ex-Service Liaison Committee, and special ex-service organisations connected with the Blackpool, Fylde and Wyre areas. At the base of each tree is a polished black granite plaque, inscribed with a badge and an epitaph.

Around this an outer circle of Downy Birch trees has been planted by the parks department in 2010 to supply the need for further ex-service dedicated plaques.

Millennium Grove
Alongside the glade is the Millennium Grove, another defined wooded area. This is devoted to the memory of service people, previously resident in the Blackpool, Fylde and Wyre boroughs, who were killed on active service this millennium.  Commemorative plaques are placed alongside selected trees.  By 2012, eight plaques were place in commemoration of local service people.

The Jim Houldsworth Bower
In 2012 Major Jim Houldsworth, a beloved leader and champion of the ex-service community, died. In his memory a new area was defined and named "The Jim Houldsworth Bower". This was planted with a half-circle of lovely Rowan trees in which was placed a memorial boulder and a timber bench inscribed with the Fylde Ex-Service Liaison Committee name and logo.

Community woodland
In the remaining woodland anyone in the community can commemorate a loved one by arranging to have a standard plaque set against a tree.

Memorial plaques
The Services Glade in the arboretum has one main monument and many plaques. The official monument bears, on its black granite top, the inscription:

 
  
The 16 plaques in the inner circle are:

References

External links
Fylde Ex Service Liaison Committee website

Arboreta in England
Parks and commons in Blackpool